K. D. Deshmukh was the Bharatiya Janata Party Member of Parliament for Balaghat, Madhya Pradesh, India.

References

Living people
India MPs 2009–2014
People from Balaghat
Lok Sabha members from Madhya Pradesh
Bharatiya Janata Party politicians from Madhya Pradesh
Janata Dal politicians
Year of birth missing (living people)